Harald Ebertz (born 18 May 1967) is a former German football goalkeeper.

External links
Career stats at kickersarchiv.de 

1967 births
Living people
German footballers
Stuttgarter Kickers players
1. FC Nürnberg players
1. FC Saarbrücken players
2. Bundesliga players
Borussia Neunkirchen players
Association football goalkeepers